Melvin Levett (born April 25, 1976) is a former American basketball player and American high school basketball coach for the Winton Woods High School Warriors. As a shooting guard he was drafted by the Detroit Pistons and then later traded to the Los Angeles Lakers organization, though he never appeared in a regular season NBA game. He played collegiately for Cincinnati. While in college, he set the University of Cincinnati single-game record for three-point field goals when he made 10 against Eastern Kentucky.

Coaching career

Colerain High School (Ohio)

2015-16 season
In 2015, Levett accepted the job as head basketball coach at Colerain High School in Cincinnati, Ohio. His first and only win came on January 8, 2016 over Sycamore High School. Nick Martini led scoring for the Cardinals with 17 points, and 3 rebounds. Despite ending the regular season 1-21, the Cardinals made it to the state playoffs (due to OHSAA rules), but then lost 77–47 in the sectional final to the Lancers of La Salle High School

Winton Woods High School (Ohio)

2018–19 season
In 2018, a year after becoming a teacher at Winton Woods High School in Cincinnati, Levett became an assistant coach for the boys varsity basketball team. The Warriors would finish the 2019 season with a 14–7 record and an appearance in the OHSAA district championship game at the University of Dayton Arena, where they would lose to the Archbishop Moeller High School Crusaders, 57–15.

References

1976 births
Living people
American expatriate basketball people in Canada
American expatriate basketball people in Hungary
American men's basketball players
Basketball players from Cleveland
Cincinnati Bearcats men's basketball players
Cincinnati Stuff players
Detroit Pistons draft picks
Harlem Globetrotters players
Parade High School All-Americans (boys' basketball)
Shooting guards
Szolnoki Olaj KK players
Sportspeople from Cleveland